Pauline Marie Ghislaine de Bassano, née van der Linden d'Hooghvorst (23 September 1814 in Meise – 9 December 1867), was a French courtier. She served as dame d'honneur to Empress Eugénie de Montijo in 1853–1867.

Life
She was born to the Belgian politician . In 1843, she married the French diplomat , 3rd Duc de Bassano. Her mother-in-law, had been  to the Empresses Josephine and Marie-Louise.

Court career

In 1853, her spouse was appointed chamberlain to Emperor Napoleon III of France, and she appointed  to the Empress.
 
It belonged to her task to receive the applications from the women wishing to be presented at court, instruct them in etiquette, approve them and finally present them, which was an important part of the Imperial protocol of representation. She also supervised the other female courtiers. Alongside the princesse d'Essling, de Bassano had a very visible public position as it belonged to her duty to accompany the empress at all grander representational public events. Being a public figure who dealt with those wishing admission to the court, she is also frequently depicted in contemporary memoirs.

Pauline de Bassano have been described as attractive, stable, imposing and somewhat arrogant. A contemporary described her as "a very distinguished looking woman, had a most charming manner and performed her duties with much discretion." 

She had an apartment in the Tuileries, and hosted private functions attended by the Parisian elite, which the empress sometimes attended, and which played a valuable role in recruiting connections and supporters of value for the Second Empire regime.

She served until her death in 1867, and was replaced by Marie-Anne Walewska.

Legacy
She belonged to the ladies-in-waiting depicted with Eugenie in the famous painting Empress Eugénie Surrounded by her Ladies in Waiting by Franz Xaver Winterhalter from 1855.

References

 Seward, Desmond: Eugénie. An empress and her empire.  (2004) 
 Allison Unruh: Aspiring to la Vie Galante: Reincarnations of Rococo in Second Empire France
 Philip Walsingham Sergeant: The last empress of the French (1907)
 Carette Madame:  Recollections of the court of the Tuileries (1890)

1814 births
1867 deaths
French duchesses
French ladies-in-waiting
People of the Second French Empire
Belgian nobility
Ladies-in-waiting to Eugénie de Montijo